Jammu Airport, officially known as Jammu Civil Enclave,  is a domestic airport serving Jammu, the winter capital of Jammu and Kashmir, India.

Infrastructure

Terminal 1
The  terminal can only handle domestic flights. It has five gates and fourteen check-in desks. A store selling traditional packaged food items, a shoes shop, a restaurant, and a souvenir store and information desk for pilgrims travelling to the Vaishno Devi temple are among the amenities available in the terminal.

Terminal 2
In September 2021, Aviation Minister Jyotiraditya Scindia announced that the there will be a new terminal of 45,000  Square Meter and an investment worth rupees 700 crores will be made.

Night Landing

"The launch of night flights encourages investment by boosting the local economy, improving air connectivity and increasing the number of tourists in the region. It also allows residents of the Jammu district to travel to the state capital and beyond. It will provide the flexibility that has been coveted for, "LG Sinha said. According to airport authorities, new carpet construction on the runway has been completed and a runway approach light system, including a series of light strips with flashing lights, has already been installed and in operation. Therefore, nighttime operations have begun at all other facilities already installed and in operation at Jammu Airport, including Instrument Landing System (ILS), CAT1 Lights, PAPI. The extended 1,300-foot runway will be integrated with the existing runway and all related work will be completed by August 31, 2021.  Jammu Airport extended its business hours in early 2019, but due to delayed runway expansion, Jammu's night flight system was put on hold.

On 17 July it was announced that Jammu airport is capable of handling night flights.

The asphalt runway, 18/36, has dimensions . It can handle CAT I instrument landing system approaches. The apron has space to park three Airbus A320 aircraft and three Boeing 737 .

Airlines and destinations

Statistics

Access
There is a car park with 80 spaces. Bus, taxi and car rental services provide transportation to the city.

Incidents and accidents

 On 9 January 2017, Air India 821, an Air India Airbus A320-200 on a scheduled flight from Delhi, overran runway 36 at Jammu on landing. The aircraft touched down at a distance of 2,400 feet from the runway threshold. Four of the eight main landing gear tires burst during the rollout and the aircraft came to a stop on soft ground 8 metres from the edge of the runway. Smoke was observed in the rear cabin and an evacuation ensued. The investigation revealed the serious incident was caused by the late touchdown and reduced deceleration rate due to improper application of the brakes. None of the 143 occupants were injured.
 June 27, 2021: Twin blasts at IAF station in Jammu airport

References

External links

Jammu Airport at the Airports Authority of India

Airports in Jammu and Kashmir
Buildings and structures in Jammu (city)
Transport in Jammu